Amalnalla Dam, is an earthfill dam on Amalnalla river near Gadchandur Ta.Korpana Chandrapur district in state of Maharashtra in India.

Specifications

Purpose
 Irrigation

See also
 Dams in Maharashtra
 List of reservoirs and dams in India

References

Dams in Chandrapur district
Dams completed in 1985
1985 establishments in Maharashtra